Metamaterials was a peer-reviewed scientific journal that was established in March 2007. It was published by Elsevier in association with the Metamorphose Network of Excellence.  The coordinating editor was Mikhail Lapine. The journal was published quarterly, with occasional special issues. It covered research concerning metamaterials, such as artificial electromagnetic materials, which includes various types of composite periodic structures and frequency selective surfaces in the microwave and optical range. Metamaterials was  abstracted and/or indexed in the following databases: Chemical Abstracts Service (CAS), Compendex, Ei Compendex, Inspec, and Scopus.

The title was discontinued in 2013, and was incorporated into Photonics and Nanostructures - Fundamentals and Applications as a special section.

Top cited articles
The following is derived from the list of Top 10 Cited articles published in the last five years, extracted from Scopus on Sunday, June 6, 2010. The articles listed here on not necessarily in order of most cited.

Sihvola, A.; Metamaterials in electromagnetics. Volume 1, Issue 1. pp 2–11 2007. . Cited 46 times in Scopus.
Boltasseva, A. and  Shalaev, V.M.;  Fabrication of optical negative-index metamaterials : Recent advances and outlook.  Volume 2, Issue 1. pp 1–17. 2008. 10.1016/j.metmat.2008.03.004. Cited 28 times in Scopus.
Shamonina, E. and Solymar, L.; Metamaterials : How the subject started. Volume 1, Issue 1. pp 12–18. 2007. . Cited 20 times in Scopus.

See also
History of metamaterials
Negative index metamaterials

References

External links 

Metamorphose Network of Excellence

Elsevier academic journals
Quarterly journals
English-language journals
Publications established in 2007
Metamaterials
Materials science journals